The Violet Line (Line 6) is a metro rail line of the Delhi Metro, a rapid transit system in Delhi, India. The line connects Kashmere Gate station in New Delhi with Raja Nahar Singh in Ballabhgarh via Faridabad.

This line acts as a parallel link for those, who travel in the heavily used Yellow Line and connects the interior parts of South Delhi, a little of Central Delhi to the satellite town of Faridabad. The stretch between ITO metro station and Kashmere Gate metro station is popularly known as the Heritage Line.

History
The Violet Line was originally planned to open in March 2010.  On 12 July 2009, a portion of a bridge under construction collapsed when its cantilever pier collapsed on load of launching girder at Zamrudpur, near East of Kailash, on the Central Secretariat – Badarpur corridor. Six people were killed and 15 others injured. The day after, on 13 July 2009, a crane that was removing the debris collapsed, and with a bowling pin effect collapsed two other nearby cranes, injuring six.

An extension from the Badarpur metro station of the line was opened on 6 September 2015 to provide connectivity to the neighbouring satellite city of Faridabad. This is the second line to cross the Delhi-Haryana border after the Yellow Line to Gurgaon. This extension runs fully elevated for 13.87 km and has 9 stations.

A further extension to Ballabhgarh (Raja Nahar Singh metro station) was opened on 19 November 2018.

The depot is in Ajronda, adjacent to Neelam Chowk Ajronda metro station.

Stations

Train info

Rolling stock

This line has standard gauge trains manufactured by a consortium of Mitsubishi-ROTEM-BEML. A total of 196 cars were ordered for 4-car configuration (46 trains) and 6-car configuration (2 trains). These trains are used in this line and Green Line. One train was manufactured in Changwon in South Korea and rest of the trains are manufactured at BEML's facility in Bangalore.

See also
List of Delhi Metro stations
Transport in Delhi

References

External links

 Delhi Metro Rail Corporation Ltd. (Official site) 
 Delhi Metro Annual Reports

Delhi Metro lines
Railway lines opened in 2010